William Barron (26 October 1917 – 2 January 2006) was an English sportsman, who played football in the higher leagues before the Second World War and, along with some football, first-class cricket afterwards.

Sporting career
William Barron was born in Herrington, Co Durham on 26 October 1917. Before the Second World War, Barron, his first name shortened to Bill, was mostly known as a footballer, playing for Wolverhampton Wanderers (though not in a first team fixture), Charlton Athletic and Northampton Town. He was mostly a forward, but played on after the war for Northampton as a left-back.

His post-war focus was on cricket: a left-handed batsman and leg-break bowler and an occasional wicketkeeper, Barron played 118 first-class games for Northamptonshire between 1946 and 1951. His first-class debut, however, came in a 1945 match for Lancashire against Yorkshire. He also played once for Sir PF Warner's XI in 1947. He died in Northampton on 2 January 2006, aged 88.

Personal life 
Barron's son Roger also became a footballer.

References

External links
Statistical summary from CricketArchive

1917 births
2006 deaths
English cricketers
Lancashire cricketers
Northamptonshire cricketers
Wolverhampton Wanderers F.C. players
Charlton Athletic F.C. players
Northampton Town F.C. players
Durham cricketers
English footballers

Hartlepool United F.C. players
Association football fullbacks
Annfield Plain F.C. players
English Football League players